The 1998 Arab Junior Athletics Championships was the eighth edition of the international athletics competition for under-20 athletes from Arab countries. It took place in Damascus, Syria – the second time the city hosted the tournament, and a fifth hosting for Syria. Damascus also hosted the senior Arab women's championships that year. A total of 41 athletics events were contested, 22 for men and 19 for women. Morocco, a regional power in the sport, did not send a team to the meeting.

The women's 10,000 metres was dropped from the programme; the 3000 metres was restored to partner the new 5000 metres race, in line with the changes at the 1996 World Junior Championships in Athletics. Due to technical limitations, performances in track races were timed to the tenth of a second, rather than the international standard to one hundredth of a second.

Tunisia topped the medal table with thirteen gold medals – all but one of them from the women's competition. Runners-up Qatar took nine gold medals but success was limited to the men's events. Algeria placed third with eight gold medals.

In the men's competition, Fawzi Al-Shammari completed a 200/400 m sprint double – a feat he would repeat at the 2003 Asian Athletics Championships. The long jump champion Hussein Al-Sabee was a global finalist the following year and had won three consecutive Asian titles five years later. Qatari gold medallists Rashid Shafi Al-Dosari (discus) and Ahmad Hassan Moussa (decathlon) would also become Asian champions.

On the women's side Atawef Hamrouni took a 100/200 m sprint double and won senior Arab sprint titles later in her career. The 5000 m champion Souad Aït Salem was the most prominent female athlete to emerge – she would win Arab, African and Mediterranean long-distance titles in the following years. High jump winner Sarah Bouaoudia won that title and the heptathlon title at the 2004 Pan Arab Games.

Medal summary

Men

Women

Medal table

References

Arab Junior Athletics Championships
International athletics competitions hosted by Syria
Sport in Damascus
Arab Junior Athletics Championships
Arab Junior Athletics Championships
20th century in Damascus
1998 in youth sport